Synechodes olivora is a moth in the family Brachodidae. It was described by Kallies in 1998. It is found in Malaysia and on Java.

Larvae have been reared from leaf stems of Elaeis guineensis and Calamus species.

References

Natural History Museum Lepidoptera generic names catalog

Brachodidae
Moths described in 1998